The first USS Renshaw was a schooner in the United States Navy during the American Civil War.

The members of the expedition named the prize, taken without papers, for Louisiana's commanding officer, Comdr. Richard T. Renshaw. R. T. Renshaw, soon renamed Renshaw so that she might also honor his brother, the late Comdr. William B. Renshaw, was placed in service as an ordnance hulk and formally purchased by the Navy from the Boston Prize Court on 28 October 1862.

She served in the North Atlantic Blockading Squadron through the remainder of the Civil War and was sold at Norfolk, Virginia on 12 August 1865.

See also

Blockade runners of the American Civil War
Blockade mail of the Confederacy 
Union Navy

References

Schooners of the United States Navy
Ships of the Union Navy
Ammunition ships of the United States Navy
American Civil War auxiliary ships of the United States
1862 ships